New Lynn railway station is on the Western Line of the Auckland railway network, New Zealand, and is part of an integrated transport centre where transfers can be made to and from bus services. A redeveloped station in a new rail trench was opened on 25 September 2010. LynnMall, a major shopping mall, is close by.

History 
 1880, March: Opens as one of the original stations on the North Auckland Line.
 1983, March: The Auckland Regional Authority decides to relocate the station east, to the other side of the Rankin Avenue-Totara Avenue-Clark Street road intersection and adjacent to the bus station, despite the uncertain future of Auckland suburban services.
 1987, August: The old station building is demolished after vandals broke in and damaged it.
 2006, December: Double-tracking between New Lynn and Avondale is approved by the central government; the $120 million package includes a 1 km long, 8m deep trench to carry the tracks, and a new station with below-ground platforms. Trenching the tracks means that they will no longer pass directly through the Rankin Avenue-Totara Avenue-Clark Street road intersection, removing a source of traffic congestion and the potential for collisions.
 2008, March: The station platform is demolished and a temporary platform constructed to make way for the rail trench earthworks.
 2010, 1 March: Trains begin running in the trench on a single track.
 2010, 29 April: The first steam train runs in the trench, Ja 1275 on the Northlander to Whangarei.
 2010, 8 June: Trains begin running through the trench on two tracks, completing the Western Line Double Tracking Project.
 2010, 24 September: The station is officially opened by the Governor-General Sir Anand Satyanand.
 2012, April–June: The station shelters are transformed and a glass encased stairwell shelter is put into place due to high patronage use.

Rail trench 

In the late 2000s, local and regional government, as part of the revitalising of the regional rail commuter network, decided to build a new "feature station" at New Lynn, which included sinking the tracks and station into a trench. Road was grade-separated from rail to enable vehicle traffic to pass over the line. Before the trenching works, the level crossings in the town centre were often blocked by passing trains, leading to substantial road congestion, which would have only increased with more train services.

The new rail trench and associated sunken station were to be constructed with up to 16m deep diaphragm walls using specially imported cranes and specialists. This was required due to the unstable, water-logged soils and the need to avoid settlement damage to close by buildings. The procedure to construct the 1 km of trench (with finished depth of up to 8m) involved multiple temporary shifts of the railway line and of various associated roads, and was called the most difficult part of the DART railway development programme in Auckland. Wet ground conditions had also forced a redesign of the trench methods, and delayed the project start by six months.

Services
Bus routes 14T, 14W, 18, 22N, 24B, 24R, 68, 191, 138, 152, 154, 161, 162, 170, 171, 172, 186, 195 and 670 travel to the bus-train interchange at New Lynn, directly adjacent to the station.

See also 
 List of Auckland railway stations
 Public transport in Auckland

References 

Rail transport in Auckland
Railway stations in New Zealand
Railway stations opened in 1880
Whau Local Board Area
Bus stations in New Zealand
Buildings and structures in Auckland
Transport buildings and structures in the Auckland Region
West Auckland, New Zealand